"Once And Never Again" is the second major label single from UK indie rock band The Long Blondes. It was released in October 2006, shortly before their debut album Someone To Drive You Home.

The song is listed at #390 on Pitchfork Media's top 500 songs of the 2000s.

The cover is a painting of Gene Pitney & Dusty Springfield.

Track listing

References 

2006 singles
The Long Blondes songs
2006 songs
Rough Trade Records singles
Song articles with missing songwriters